Alfred Brailly (8 October 1890 – 17 November 1951) was a French racing cyclist. He rode in the 1919 Tour de France.

References

1890 births
1951 deaths
French male cyclists
Place of birth missing